Herculano is both a surname and given name. Notable people with the name include:
Alexandre Herculano (1810–1877), Portuguese novelist and historian
Suzana Herculano-Houzel (born 1972), Brazilian neuroscientist
 (1800–1867), Brazilian politician